3,11-Dihydroxydodecanoic acid is a chemical found in royal jelly.

See also
3,10-Dihydroxydecanoic acid

References

Fatty acids
Beta hydroxy acids
Bee products
Diols